The year 1919 was a common year of the Gregorian calendar.

1919 may also refer to:

1919 (band), a post-punk British band 
1919 (film), a 1985 British film
1919 (novel), a 1932 novel in the U.S.A. trilogy by John Dos Passos
M1919 Browning machine gun

See also

The Unforgettable Year 1919, a 1951 Soviet film 
Paris 1919 (album), a 1973 album by John Cale